DPBS may refer to:

 Dulbecco's phosphate-buffered saline, a buffer solution used in biological research
 DPBS (CONFIG.SYS directive), a configuration directive in DOS